Tauatua Lucas (born 23 November 1994) is a Tahitian footballer who plays as a striker for A.S. Tefana in the Tahiti Ligue 1.

References

1994 births
Living people
French Polynesian footballers
Association football forwards
Tahiti international footballers
2016 OFC Nations Cup players